Human trafficking in Iran is the phenomenon of human trafficking in Iran for the purposes of sexual exploitation or involuntary servitude.

The Iranian government prohibits all forms of trafficking in persons through its 2004 Law on Combating Human Trafficking, which prescribes severe penalties, often including death sentences for convicted traffickers.

U.S. State Department report
The U.S. State Department's Office to Monitor and Combat Trafficking in Persons placed the country in "Tier 3"  in 2017.

According to a yearly report by the U.S. State Department on June 27, 2017, "Iranian girls aged 13 to 17 are targets of human trafficking gangs that are forcibly transmitted for sale and sexual services outside of Iran.".

According to the United States, the Government of Iran does not comply with the minimum standards for the elimination of trafficking and is not making significant efforts to do so. Lack of access to Iran by U.S. Government officials prohibits the collection of full data on the country's human trafficking problem and the government's efforts to curb it. Iran has not provided evidence of law enforcement activities against trafficking to the US government.

In the annual report of the U.S. State Department on June 27, 2017, mentions the trafficking of human beings to Iranian girls who have houses in Kurdistan, Iraq, especially in Sulaimaniyah, for sex trade, and some have been taken there by smugglers.

On June 27, 2017, the U.S. State Department released its annual report on human trade. According to this report, Iranian authorities and the Revolutionary Guards force Afghan refugees to fight in Syria and Iraq. The report also notes that Iran has become the source and destination of men, women, and children exposed to trafficking in women and forced labor over the past five years.

Iranian government reports
According to a report from the National Security Police of the Tehran Grand Command, as well as reports from the Center of Women's Affairs and the Committee of the Organization for the Defense of Victims of Violence in 2003, the smuggling of border women and girls to the Persian Gulf Arab states, Pakistan, Afghanistan, and Europe has expanded. Smugglers transmitted their victims from Bangladesh, Afghanistan, and Pakistan to Iran and then sent them to Europe. In 2003, the number of gangs detected and defused in the West Azerbaijan Province reached to 200.

In this regard, Ali Sadeghi, the head of the Immigration Police and the Iranian government's police law enforcement passport, admitted in February 2013 that Iranian girls were being trafficked to the Arab states of the southern margin of the Persian Gulf. At the same time, Ismail Ahmadi Moghaddam, commander of the country's police forces, said that the main destination is human trafficking from Iran, European countries, Australia and Canada. On the other hand, every year in Iran, the situation of children is worse and the age of prostitution is lower.

See also
Prostitution in Iran

References

 
Iran
Iran
Human rights abuses in Iran